Panasonic Lumix DMC-TZ60 is a digital camera by Panasonic Lumix. The highest-resolution pictures it records is 18.1 megapixels.

Properties
LEICA DC
30x optical zoom
High Sensitivity MOS sensor
HYBRID O.I.S.+ stabilization
GPS tagging

References

External links
 https://www.panasonic.com/au/support/product-archives/lumix-cameras-video-cameras/lumix-digital-cameras/dmc-tz60.html

Point-and-shoot cameras
TZ60